Uppala-guptam is a village in Dr. B.R. Ambedkar Konaseema district in Uppalaguptam Mandal, in the state of Andhra Pradesh in India.

The name Uppala-guptam may have been derived from uppala meaning  blue water lilly in Pali language. This plant is very endemic to the area. It is believed that Buddhist monks regularly traveled through the area on their way to Sri Lanka. The fact that this place is on the way to adurru Buddhist stupa 18 kilometers south-west is also significant.

References 

Villages in Uppalaguptam mandal